Byron Ortile is a Filipino child actor and commercial model,  known for his role as Alvin in Sine Novela Gaano Kadalas ang Minsan, playing the son of Marvin Agustin and Camille Prats.

Career
Ortile began as a commercial model. He began acting as a child actor with his debut in Sine Novela Gaano Kadalas ang Minsan. As a child actor, he starred as the younger version to award-winning actors such as Alden Richards and Sid Lucero, as well as portrayed the son of award-winning actresses such as Sharon Cuneta and Claudine Barretto in teleseryes.

Filmography

Televisions

Movie

References

External links

2002 births
Living people
Filipino male child actors

Filipino male television actors
GMA Network personalities
TV5 (Philippine TV network) personalities
ABS-CBN personalities